Collins House may refer to:

in Australia
 Collins House (Melbourne), a skyscraper under construction in Melbourne, Australia

in the United States
(by state then city)
 Collins-Marston House, Mobile, Alabama
 Collins-Robinson House, Mobile, Alabama
 Murphy-Collins House, Tuscaloosa, Alabama, listed on the National Register of Historic Places (NRHP)
Dr. Frank Finney House, La Junta, Colorado, also known as the Hofmann-Collins House
 Collins Potato House, Laurel, Delaware
 Collins-Odom-Strickland House, Macon, Georgia, listed on the NRHP
 Daniel Dove Collins House, Collinsville, Illinois
 Collins House (Davenport, Iowa)
 Capt. N. Collins House District, Petersburg, Kentucky, listed on the NRHP
 Collins House (Todds Point, Kentucky), listed on the NRHP
 Jackson Collins House, Centreville, Maryland
 Collins Cottages Historic District, Eastham, Massachusetts
 Frederick Collins House, Newton, Massachusetts
 William Collins House (Fall River, Massachusetts)
 George H. Collins House, Tylertown, Mississippi, listed on the NRHP
 David Gordon House and Collins Log Cabin, Columbia, Missouri
 James V. Collins House, Anaconda, Montana, listed on the NRHP
 Timothy Edwards Collins Mansion, Great Falls, Montana
 Isaac Collins House, Burlington, New Jersey, listed on the NRHP
 Jonathan C. Collins House and Cemetery, Constableville, New York
 Nathaniel Bishop Collins House, Berkshire, New York
 Collins House (Syracuse, New York)
 George Collins House, Salem, Oregon, listed on the NRHP
 Collins Mansion, West Chester, Pennsylvania
James E. Collins House, Franklin, Tennessee
 Collins House and Granary, Uniontown, Washington, listed on the NRHP
 John Collins House, Caledonia, Wisconsin, listed on the NRHP
 William Collins House (Madison, Wisconsin)

See also
William Collins House (disambiguation)
Collins Building (disambiguation)